Dadi El Hocine Mouaki (born 11 September 1996) is an Algerian footballer who plays for JS Kabylie in the Algerian Ligue Professionnelle 1.

References

External links 

1996 births
Living people
Algerian footballers
Association football forwards
Algerian expatriate footballers
Expatriate footballers in Tunisia
Algerian expatriate sportspeople in Tunisia
USM Alger players
US Biskra players
NA Hussein Dey players
Étoile Sportive du Sahel players
USM Bel Abbès players
21st-century Algerian people